Pete Sampras defeated the defending champion Boris Becker in the final, 3–6, 7–6(7–5), 7–6(7–4), 6–7(11–13), 6–4 to win the singles tennis title at the 1996 ATP Tour World Championships. It was his third Tour Finals title.

Seeds
A champion seed is indicated in bold text while text in italics indicates the round in which that seed was eliminated.

Draw

Finals

Red group
Standings are determined by: 1. number of wins; 2. number of matches; 3. in two-players-ties, head-to-head records; 4. in three-players-ties, percentage of sets won, or of games won; 5. steering-committee decision.

White group
Standings are determined by: 1. number of wins; 2. number of matches; 3. in two-players-ties, head-to-head records; 4. in three-players-ties, percentage of sets won, or of games won; 5. steering-committee decision.

See also
ATP World Tour Finals appearances

External links
 1996 ATP Tour World Championships Round robin Draw (Red Group)
 1996 ATP Tour World Championships Round robin Draw (White Group)
 1996 ATP Tour World Championships Finals Draw

Singles
1996 in German tennis
Tennis tournaments in Germany
Sport in Hanover